Animaniacs: a Gigantic Adventure is an action game based on the Jazz Jackrabbit 2 engine developed by EAI Interactive and published by SouthPeak Interactive. It was released in North America on June 15, 1999.

Plot
Thaddeus Plotz, after many years of dealing with Yakko, Wakko, and Dot, orders Ralph to round up all the Animaniacs merchandise and hide them around the studio. While doing that, Plotz orders all of the Warner Siblings be locked up in a psychiatric hospital. However, the three escape and the player must retrieve all of the hidden objects.

Gameplay
The game is a 2D platforming side-scroller. The player controls the Warner siblings across eleven environments, including: the Warner Bros. movie studio, an ocean liner ship, and an Iceberg. The three playable characters have their own weapons: Wakko has a baseball bat, Yakko uses a rubber mallet, and Dot can throw anvils.

Reception
IGN gave the game 3.5 out of 10 and called it "awful", while aggregator GameRankings gave it an above-average rating of 60%.

References

External links
 Animaniacs: A Gigantic Adventure at MobyGames

1999 video games
Windows games
Windows-only games
Video games based on Animaniacs
Video games developed in the United States
SouthPeak Games
Single-player video games
EAI Interactive games